UTC+11:00 is an identifier for a time offset from UTC of +11:00. This time is used in:

As standard time (year-round) 
Principal cities: Nouméa, Magadan, Honiara, Port Vila, Palikir, Weno, Buka, Arawa

North Asia 
Russia – Magadan Time
Far Eastern Federal District
Magadan Oblast, Sakhalin Oblast and Sakha Republic (eastern part of Sakha Republic (including Abyysky, Allaikhovsky, Momsky, Nizhnekolymsky, Srednekolymsky and Verkhnekolymsky); Oymyakonsky, Ust-Yansky, and Verkhoyansky districts)

Oceania

Pacific Ocean

Micronesia
Federated States of Micronesia
Kosrae
Pohnpei

Melanesia
France
New Caledonia
Loyalty Islands
Papua New Guinea
Bougainville only (Except all the region)
North Bougainville District
Central Bougainville District
South Bougainville District
Solomon Islands
Vanuatu

As standard time (Southern Hemisphere winter) 
Principal towns: Burnt Pine, Kingston

Oceania 
Australia
Norfolk Island

As daylight saving time (Southern Hemisphere summer) 
Principal cities: Canberra, Sydney, Melbourne, Hobart

Oceania
Australia – Australian Eastern Daylight Saving Time (AEDT)
Australian Capital Territory
Jervis Bay Territory
New South Wales (except Broken Hill and its surrounds, as well as Lord Howe Island)
Tasmania
Victoria

Discrepancies between official UTC+11:00 and geographical UTC+11:00

Areas in UTC+11:00 longitudes using other time zones 
Using UTC+10:30
 Australia
 Lord Howe Island (standard time) 

Using UTC+12:00
United States
 Wake Island
Russia
 The western part of Chukotka Autonomous Okrug
 Kamchatka Krai
Marshall Islands
Nauru

Using UTC+12:00 and DST UTC+13:00
New Zealand
The most part of South Island

Areas outside UTC+11:00 longitudes using UTC+11:00 time

Areas between 127°30′ E and 157°30′ E ("Physical" UTC+09:00 and UTC+10:00) 
Solomon Islands
 Shortland Islands
Choiseul, with an exception in very east
 The western part of New Georgia Islands 
Papua New Guinea
 Autonomous Region of Bougainville, except island in very east
Russia
 The most part of Magadan Oblast
 Shakalin Oblast 
Russian territory of Kuril Islands
Sakhalin Island (partly within the "physical" UTC+09:00 area)
 The eastern part of Sakha Republic (partly within the "physical" UTC+09:00 area)

See also 
 Time in Australia
 Time in Russia

References

External links 

 Find cities currently in UTC+11

UTC offsets